Blair Walter Bush (born November 25, 1956) is a center who played 17 seasons in the National Football League for four teams.

Early life and education
Bush was born in Fort Hood, Texas. He played high school football at Palos Verdes in Palos Verdes Estates, California and college football for the University of Washington, where he was named to the 1977 All-Pacific-8 Conference football team, the 1978 All-Pacific-10 Conference football team, and the 1977 College Football All-America Team. 

At the University of Washington, Bush was a member of the Lambda Chi Alpha fraternity.

NFL career
Bush entered the National Football League in 1978 and player for 17 seasons with the Cincinnati Bengals from 1978 to 1982, the Seattle Seahawks from 1983 to 1988, the Green Bay Packers from 1988 to 1991, and the Los Angeles Rams from 1992 to 1994.

In January 1982, as a member of the Cincinnati Bengals, he played in Super Bowl XVI.

1956 births
Living people
American football centers
Washington Huskies football players
Cincinnati Bengals players
Seattle Seahawks players
Green Bay Packers players
Los Angeles Rams players
National Football League replacement players
Ed Block Courage Award recipients